Emmanuel Agyenim "Ema" Boateng (born 17 January 1994) is a Ghanaian professional footballer who plays as a winger for New England Revolution of Major League Soccer (MLS).

Early life and education 
Boateng was born and raised in Ghana in a home that lacked running water and electricity. As a preteen, he was selected to join the Right to Dream Academy where he combined academic studies with football training.

In 2009 at the age of 15, Boateng moved to the United States on a scholarship to attend Cate School in Carpinteria, California. In addition to playing for the Cate School team, he also appeared for other local youth sides in Santa Barbara Soccer Club and South Coast Strikers. Boateng received the 2012 Gatorade Player of the Year award, presented to him by former winner Alexi Lalas, and became the first recipient in Cate School's 100+ year history across all sports. He skipped his final year of high school to enroll early at the University of California, Santa Barbara, despite interest from Manchester City F.C. to sign him on professional terms.

While at UCSB, Boateng played college soccer for the UC Santa Barbara Gauchos men's soccer team. In his first year in 2012, he appeared in 18 games, scoring 4 goals and adding 4 assists.

Club career

Helsingborgs 
During the summer of 2013, he played with USL Premier Development League side Ventura County Fusion while still enrolled in college.

He appeared in 5 games for the Fusion, scoring once.

After receiving an invitation to train with Swedish Allsvenskan side Helsingborgs IF later that summer, Boateng paid for his own airplane ticket across the Atlantic Ocean to be able to visit the club.  He made a big impression and soon thereafter they signed him to a three-and-a-half-year contract in July 2013. He would appear in 37 Allsvenskan matches over his three seasons with the club, scoring 4 times in the league. He also helped the club reach the Svenska Cupen final in 2014, scoring two goals in five appearances, and came on as a second-half substitute in the final itself; a 0–1 defeat to IF Elfsborg on 18 May.

LA Galaxy 

Boateng was transferred to LA Galaxy of Major League Soccer in January 2016. He made his debut against the Colorado Rapids on 12 March 2016, where he replaced Mike Magee, but was unable to save the Galaxy from a 1–0 loss. He scored his first goal for the club on 23 April 2016 against Real Salt Lake, helping the Galaxy to a 5–2 victory, while also notching two assists. This performance earned him Player of the Week honors. Boateng scored his second goal of the season on 7 September, the first goal of a 3–3 draw at RSL.

During the 2016 MLS Cup Playoffs, in LA's knockout round match against Real Salt Lake, Boateng fouled Javier Morales, conceding a penalty which was successfully taken by Joao Plata to tie the game at 1. However, Boateng atoned for his mistake by scoring two goals within eight minutes, leading Galaxy to a 3–1 win. After the game, teammate Landon Donovan compared Boateng's first goal to Lionel Messi, saying that "he has that in him", while manager Bruce Arena described his performance as an "excellent, break out game".

Boateng's contract with LA Galaxy concluded at the end of their 2018 season. Boateng re-signed with Galaxy on 14 January 2019.

D.C. United 
On 7 August 2019, Boateng was traded to D.C. United in exchange for $250,000 of Targeted Allocation Money. He made his first appearance for DC United in a game against the Vancouver Whitecaps FC on 17 August 2019, subbing in for Leonardo Jara in 67th minute. His 2020 option was exercised by D.C. United after the 2019 season.

Columbus Crew 
On 14 August 2020, Boateng was traded to the Columbus Crew in exchange for Axel Sjöberg, reuniting him with former LA Galaxy teammate Gyasi Zardes. He made his debut on 20 August 2020, coming on as a substitute in a 3–0 win over the Chicago Fire. He won the MLS Cup for being part of the squad even though he didn't play in the final match and was an unused substitute for the match. His team won by a 3–0 win through a Lucas Zelarayán brace and a goal from Derrick Etienne. That win was the teams first trophy since 2008. His fellow Ghanaian compatriots Jonathan Mensah and Harrison Afful played the full 90 minutes though.  Columbus declined their contract option on Boateng following their 2020 season.

New England Revolution
On 7 January 2021, Boateng signed with New England Revolution as a free agent. Following the 2022 season, New England opted to decline his contract option. He re-signed with the club on 24 February 2023.

Personal life 
His story was featured in The Beautiful Game, a 2012 documentary about football in Africa, and on CNN's report on the Right to Dream Academy.

It was reported that Boateng received his U.S. citizenship in 2016.

Outside of football, Boateng's ambition is to become a doctor. He speaks three languages.

Career statistics

Honors 
Columbus Crew
MLS Cup: 2020

New England Revolution
Supporters' Shield: 2021

References

External links 

 
 
 UC Santa Barbara player profile
 Right to Dream Academy player profile

1994 births
Living people
Association football forwards
Association football midfielders
Helsingborgs IF players
LA Galaxy players
D.C. United players
Columbus Crew players
New England Revolution players
Allsvenskan players
Major League Soccer players
Ghanaian footballers
Ghanaian expatriate footballers
Ghanaian expatriate sportspeople in Sweden
Expatriate footballers in Sweden
UC Santa Barbara Gauchos men's soccer players
People from Carpinteria, California
Right to Dream Academy players
Footballers from Accra
Sportspeople from Santa Barbara County, California